Robert of Uzès or Robert d'Uzès was a medieval Dominican friar and author. A contemporary of Dante and Eckhart, in 1292 he wrote a Livre des Paroles, in which a dream is used as a political prophecy and to satirize the rich and powerful, particularly Pope Boniface VIII. It predicts great calamities and comes from the same milieu and perspective as Joachim of Fiore and the "spirituels".

Sources

Members of the Dominican Order
13th-century French writers